The Morgan Hill Unified School District (MHUSD) is a public school district operating eight elementary schools, two middle schools, and three high schools in southern Santa Clara County, California. Its jurisdiction covers all of Morgan Hill, California, and San Martin, California, as well as Coyote Valley and the Santa Teresa district of San Jose, California. Alongside its traditional schools, MHUSD, in special partnership with The Tech Interactive and Stanford University, operates four specialized public "focus academies", in STEAM, mathematics and music, engineering, and health sciences.MHUSD schools have been awarded as National Blue Ribbon Schools, California Distinguished Schools, and California Gold Ribbon Schools.

History
Live Oak Union High School was established in 1903. At the organization of Live Oak Union, previously existing rural school districts Highland, Burnett, San Martin, Machado, and Morgan Hill were included, and, in August 1921, Coyote, Llagas and Uvas districts were added to what eventually became Morgan Hill Unified School District.

In September 2004, Ann Sobrato High School was opened to grades 9 through 10. By August 2006, the school was fully staffed and supported grades 9 through 12. The 120-acre (49 ha) tract for the school was donated by the Sobrato family, in honor of Ann Sobrato.

Administration

The district has 400 Full-Time Equivalent (FTE) teachers, serving 8809 students, across 14 schools. The district is governed by a publicly elected seven-member Board of Education, while management is entrusted to the Superintendent, who is selected by the Board.

The district's jurisdiction area covers 296 square miles (767 square kilometers) in southern Santa Clara County, stretching all of Morgan Hill, California, all of San Martin, California, all of unincorporated Coyote Valley, and the Santa Teresa district of San Jose, California.

Academics

Focus Academies
Alongside its traditional schools, MHUSD, in special partnership with The Tech Interactive (formerly the Tech Museum of Innovation), a leading Silicon Valley institution, operates 5 specialized public "focus academies", through its innovative Tech Academies Initiative: Focus Academies will provide the opportunity for students to specialize their studies within broad fields (engineering, STEAM, maths, music, health sciences), allowing for greater, in-depth learning within subjects within programs designed by noted subject matter experts, including scientists from The Tech Museum of Innovation and Stanford University medical professors.

Paradise Valley Engineering Academy
P.A. Walsh STEAM Academy  — run in partnership with The Tech Museum of Innovation
Jackson Academy of Maths & Music
El Toro Health Science Academy  — first elementary-level health sciences program in California; created in partnership with Stanford University
San Martin/Gwinn Environmental Science Academy

Awards and rankings
MHUSD schools were awarded as California Distinguished Schools in 1989, 1993, 1995, 1997, 2004, and 2012.

Jackson was awarded as a National Blue Ribbon School in 1999.

Four schools in the district were awarded as California Gold Ribbon Schools in 2015, including Sobrato and Live Oak, which were also awarded as California Exemplary Programs in 2015.

Schools
Schools highlighted in pale green are MHUSD Focus Academies.

Elementary schools

Charter schools

Middle schools

High schools

References

External links 
 
Charter School of Morgan Hill

Morgan Hill, California
School districts in Santa Clara County, California
1903 establishments in California